BA10 may refer to:

 BA10, a postcode district in the BA postcode area
 BA-10, an armored car developed in the Soviet Union in the 1930s
 Brodmann area 10, part of the frontal cortex in the human brain